The Dominican Workers Party (PTD) was a communist party in the Dominican Republic founded in 1979. The leader and secretary general of the party was José González Espinosa. In the 16 May 2006 election, the party was a member of the winning Progressive Bloc.

In December 2019, the party was transformed into People's Force.

The party published a periodical, Liberación.

References

1979 establishments in the Dominican Republic
2019 disestablishments in the Dominican Republic
Communist parties in the Dominican Republic
Defunct political parties in the Dominican Republic
Political parties disestablished in 2019
Political parties established in 1979